The Massacre at 11th Parallel occurred in 1963, when men hired by a rubber company killed 3500 members of the indigenous Amazon group Cinta Larga and destroyed their village. Only two villagers survived. 

The massacre was a part of the larger, ongoing genocide of indigenous peoples in Brazil.

Background
In the late 19th century, a rubber boom occurred in the Amazon, which had a largely negative impact on the native inhabitants. Indigenous people were used for slave labor in order to produce rubber. The spread of various diseases and violence associated with the rubber boom reduced the indigenous population of the area by 90%. Many of the survivors fled into remote parts of the Amazon, where their descendants settled.

The 1920s conflict between the Cinta Larga group and rubber tappers grew in the 1960s. In 1960, the feud was continuing when the Cuiabá-Porto Velho (BR-364) highway was inaugurated. The Cinta Larga faced multiple threats including rubber tappers and prospectors prospecting for gold and diamonds.

Massacre and aftermath
The massacre took place in the headwaters of the Aripuanã River in Mato Grosso, at the 11th parallel south, where the firm Arruda, Junqueira & Co was collecting rubber. The massacre was planned by the head of the firm, Antonio Mascarenhas Junqueira. He wanted to remove the Cinta Larga from the area. He said, "These Indians are parasites, they are shameful. It’s time to finish them off, it’s time to eliminate these pests. Let’s liquidate these vagabonds."

He then hired a plane to drop dynamite on the village and gunmen to attack the village on foot with machine guns to kill any survivors. The gunmen, in one incident, took a baby from a breastfeeding mother and shot the baby's head off. They then hung the woman upside down and sliced her in half. Two villagers survived the attack while 30 perished.

The attack came to light when one of the perpetrators, Atayde Pereira dos Santos, reported it and those responsible to the Serviço de Proteção ao Índio (SPI) Inspectorate in Cuiabá, after not being paid the amount of money he had been promised. At the trial of one of the accused, the presiding judge said, "We have never listened to a case where there was so much violence, so much ignominy, egoism and savagery and so little appreciation of human life." In 1975 one of the perpetrators, José Duarte de Prado, was sentenced to 10 years imprisonment, but was pardoned later that year. He declared during the trial, "It’s good to kill Indians – they are lazy and treacherous." Although 134 officials faced initial charges of alleged involvement in more than 1,000 crimes related to the massacre, none were jailed. 

Details of the massacre were included in the landmark Figueiredo Report of 1967, which led to the replacement of the SPI with the Fundação Nacional do Índio (FUNAI).

The indigenous rights campaign group Survival International was founded in response to the report, two years after its original release by public prosecutor Jader de Figueiredo Correia. More recently, Survival International used this massacre as an example of why disconnected tribes avoid contact with the outside world, in an article titled 'Why do they hide?'

See also
List of massacres in Brazil
Genocide of indigenous peoples in Brazil

References

Massacres in Brazil
1963 in Brazil
Mass murder in 1963
Conflicts in 1963
Massacres in 1963
Mato Grosso
Indigenous topics of the Amazon
1963 murders in Brazil